Matthew Tree (born December 30, 1958) is a writer in English and Catalan. He has lived in Barcelona since 1984.

Work
Apart from publishing both fiction and non-fiction, he is a contributor to various newspapers and magazines such as Catalonia Today, The Times Literary Supplement, Barcelona INK, Altaïr, El Punt Avui and L'Esguard. He has also appeared on various Catalan language radio and TV stations and is current a monthly guest on Catalunya Ràdio's chat show L'Oracle. In 2005 and 2006 he scripted and presented two series of the infotainment programme Passatgers for TV3 (Catalan Public Television).

Politically, Tree has declared his support for Catalan independence.

Bibliography
Fora de lloc, novel, Cafè Central-EUMO, 1996.
Ella ve quan vol, short stories, Edicions 3i4, Octubre de Narrativa Award 1999.
CAT. Un anglès viatja per Catalunya per veure si existeix, Ed. Columna, 2000. A road book.
Privilegiat, novel, ed. Columna, Columna 2001 Award. Translated into Castilian from the English version: Privilegiado (Muntaner Editors, 2001).
Memòries! 1974-1989. Dels quinze anys fins als trenta. Londres-Barcelona Autobiography. Ed. Columna, 2004. Contra la monarquia. Ed. Ara Llibres, 2004. An anti-monarchical diatribe.
Aniversari. Quatre reflexions sense cap mena d'importància després de passar exactament vint anys entre els catalans. Essay on various experiences in Catalonia. Ed. Columna, 2005. Two editions.
La puta feina. Ed. Ara Llibres, 2006. A diatribe against work.
La vida després de Déu,  Ed. Ara Llibres, 2007. An essay on religion.
Negre de merda. El racisme explicat als blancs. An essay on racism. Ed. Columna Edicions, 2010.
Com explicar aquest país als estrangers. Ed. Columna Edicions, 2011. A translation into Catalan of previously published articles in English, mainly about Catalonia.
Barcelona, Catalonia. A View from the Inside. Ed. Cookwood Press, 2011. A complete collection of previously published articles and lectures in English.
SNUG, a novel. Promotional edition published by AK Digital (Antonia Kerrigan Literary Agency), 2013.
He has also contributed short stories and essays to over a dozen different anthologies.

References

External links
 Official website

1958 births
Living people
English emigrants to Spain
Catalan-language writers
English writers
Exophonic writers
Writers from London
English-language writers from Catalonia